Giuseppe Orlandini (born 1922) was an Italian film director and screenwriter. He directed ten films between 1940 and 1967.

Filmography
 Continuavano a chiamarli... er più e er meno (1972)
 I clan dei due borsalini (1971)
 I due maggiolini più matti del mondo (1970)
 Gli infermieri della mutua (1969)
 I due crociati (1968)
 I due vigili (1967)
 La ragazzola (1965)
 La pupa (1963)
 Cronache del '22 (1962)
 Tutti innamorati (1959)

External links

1922 births
Possibly living people
Italian film directors
Italian screenwriters
Italian male screenwriters